The Chatham Southern Railway Depot is a historic train station at 340 Whitehead Street in Chatham, Virginia.

Built in 1918-19 by the Southern Railway, it was a major hub of the city's economic activity until passenger service was discontinued in 1965, and freight service in 1975.

The building is a long rectangular single story masonry structure, from which a polygonal tower rises on  stories on the track side.  It has a hipped roof with flared eaves supported by large wooden brackets.

It has been owned by the Pittsylvania County Historical Society since 2001, which plans to restore the building and use it as a veterans' museum.

The depot was listed on the National Register of Historic Places in 2015.

See also
National Register of Historic Places listings in Pittsylvania County, Virginia

References

External links
 Chatham Train Station - Pittsylvania County Historical Society

Stations along Southern Railway lines in the United States
Railway stations on the National Register of Historic Places in Virginia
Railway stations in the United States opened in 1919
Buildings and structures in Pittsylvania County, Virginia
National Register of Historic Places in Pittsylvania County, Virginia
Railway stations closed in 1975